Washington Township is a township in Jones County, Iowa.

History
Washington Township was organized in 1842.

References

Populated places in Jones County, Iowa
Townships in Iowa
Populated places established in 1842
1842 establishments in Iowa Territory